The city of Portageville, Missouri, located in Missouri's 8th congressional district in southeastern Missouri, is one of the largest cities in New Madrid County, Missouri, one of the five oldest counties in the state.

References
 Missouri Secretary of State official manuals

Key

Portageville